Saifai International Cricket Stadium is a cricket stadium of International Standard in Saifai (Etawah district), Uttar Pradesh, India. It is situated inside Major Dhyan Chand Sports College's campus. With a seating capacity of 43,000 people, it is one of the largest cricket stadium in India (capacity wise). There is an All-weather Swimming Pool, Athletics Stadium and Indoor Stadium too in the campus of Sports College along with this cricket stadium. It was inaugurated on 1Jun 2018, along with Etawah Safari Park and Abhinav Vidyalaya, Saifai at a function in Etawah city.

History 
This stadium's building was started in Samajwadi Party government, till 2017. It is built in the native village of then Uttar Pradesh chief minister Akhilesh Yadav, he approved the building plan in August 2015 in his government's cabinate meeting. its majority work was finished but building work halted due to monetary issues.

See also
Green Park Stadium
Ekana International Cricket Stadium
Major Dhyan Chand Sports College, Saifai
Master Chandgiram Sports Stadium

References

Buildings and structures in Etawah district
Cricket grounds in Uttar Pradesh
Sports venues in Uttar Pradesh
Saifai
Sports venues completed in 2018
2018 establishments in Uttar Pradesh
Sport in Saifai